is a 1960 Japanese drama film directed by Mikio Naruse.

Plot
After the death of his father, Hideo and his mother Shigeko leave Ueda, Nagano, for Tokyo, where she starts a job at a ryokan, while Hideo moves in with his uncle's family. He befriends the slightly younger Junko, the daughter of Shigeko's employer Naoyo, herself the mistress of a married businessman who finances the ryokan. The two children start making repeated trips around the city together, which finally lead them to the ocean that Hideo only knows from pictures. Hideo is eventually left alone when his mother runs off with a guest and Junko moves away after her father sold her mother's business.

Cast
Kenzaburō Ōsawa as Hideo
Nobuko Otowa as Shigeko, Hideo's mother
Kamatari Fujiwara as Hideo's uncle
Natsuko Kahara as Hideo's aunt
Yosuke Natsuki as Shotaro
Futaba Ichiki as Junko (as Futaba Hitotsugi)
Murasaki Fujima as Naoyo, Junko's mother
Daisuke Katō as Tomioka
Hisako Hara as Harue
Seizaburō Kawazu as Kasao
Kin Sugai as ryokan maid

References

External links

1960 films
1960 drama films
Japanese drama films
Films directed by Mikio Naruse
Toho films
Films scored by Ichirō Saitō
1960s Japanese films